Jerónimo Francisco de Lima (Lisbon, September 30, 1743 - February 19, 1822) was a Portuguese composer.  He wrote a number of operas, which were performed in Lisbon. Among his other compositions are a number of sacred works, including a Dixit Dominus and a Magnificat for four voices with basso continuo.

References
J. Mazza: Dicionário biográfico de músicos portugueses (Lisboa, 1944–5)
M.C. de Brito: Opera in Portugal in the Eighteenth Century (Cambridge, 1989)
M.C. de Brito: Jerónimo Francisco de Lima, no New Grove Dictionary of Music and Musicians

1743 births
1822 deaths
Portuguese classical composers
Portuguese opera composers
People from Lisbon
18th-century Portuguese people
19th-century Portuguese people
Portuguese male classical composers